The Florida Panhandle (also West Florida and Northwest Florida) is the northwestern part of the U.S. state of Florida; it is a salient roughly  long and  wide, lying between Alabama on the north and the west, Georgia on the north, and the Gulf of Mexico to the south. Its eastern boundary is arbitrarily defined. In terms of population, major communities include Tallahassee, Pensacola, and Panama City.

As is the case with the other eight U.S. states that have panhandles, the geographic meaning of the term is inexact and elastic. References to the Florida Panhandle always include the ten counties west of the Apalachicola River, a natural geographic boundary, which was the historic dividing line between the British colonies of West Florida and East Florida. These western counties also lie in the Central Time Zone (with the exception of Gulf County, which is divided between the Eastern and Central Time zones), while the rest of the state is in the Eastern Time Zone. References to the Panhandle may also include some or all of eleven counties immediately east of the Apalachicola known as the Big Bend region, along the curve of Apalachee Bay.

Like the rest of North Florida, including North Central Florida, the Panhandle is more similar in culture and climate to the Deep South than the rest of the state, particularly to Central Florida and South Florida in the lower peninsula, being known for its conservative politics and "piney woods."

The largest city in the Panhandle is Tallahassee, the state capital, population 196,169 (2020). However, the largest population grouping is the Pensacola Metropolitan Area with a population of 511,502 (2020), which includes the second and third largest communities in the region, Pensacola and Navarre. The total population of the Panhandle, as of the 2010 Census, was 1,407,925, just under 7.5% of Florida's total population as recorded in the same census. At roughly 70 persons per square mile, its population density is less than one fifth of Florida's as a whole.

Coastal regions

Emerald Coast

Emerald Coast, a term coined in 1983, refers in general to the beaches and coastal resorts from Pensacola to Port St. Joe, but is sometimes used to refer, by extension, to the Panhandle as a whole, especially west of the Apalachicola. Earlier designations include "Playground of the Gulfcoast" and the "Miracle Strip", especially for the area between Fort Walton Beach and Panama City. Coastal regions of the following counties (if not the entirety of the counties themselves) are usually included when referring to the Emerald Coast:

 Okaloosa County 
 Santa Rosa County 
 Walton County

Coastal portions of Escambia County (namely Pensacola Beach) that lie on the western edge, and coastal portions of Bay County that lie on the eastern edge, are also regularly included when referring to the Emerald Coast, but with somewhat less regularity than the three aforementioned counties listed above. However, the agency providing water, sewer, and garbage collection services to unincorporated Escambia County, which is headquartered in Pensacola, is called the Emerald Coast Utility Authority.

Forgotten Coast

The Forgotten Coast is a trademarked term coined in the early 1990s used to refer to the coastal portion of the Florida Panhandle extending from Mexico Beach or southeastern Bay County on the Gulf of Mexico to St. Marks on Apalachee Bay. It is usually not considered a part of the Emerald Coast, which lies directly adjacent to the west. Coastal regions of the following counties (if not the entirety of the counties themselves) are usually included when referring to the Forgotten Coast:

 Gulf County
 Franklin County
 Wakulla County
 Small portions of Bay County

Physical features
The Apalachicola River is the largest river of the Panhandle. It is formed by the junction of several rivers, including the Chattahoochee and the Flint, where the boundaries of Alabama, Georgia, and Florida meet. From there, it flows southward to the town of Apalachicola.

Major estuaries include, from west to east: Perdido Bay, fed by the Perdido River, which forms the western boundary of Florida; Escambia Bay and East Bay, fed by the Escambia River and Blackwater River, respectively; Choctawhatchee Bay, fed by the Choctawhatchee River; and St. Andrews Bay, fed by Econfina Creek. Pensacola Bay, a deepwater port, is formed by the joining of Escambia and East bays. The Gulf Intracoastal Waterway, completed in 1949, traverses the lower Panhandle by means of bays, lagoons, sounds, and man-made canals. The barrier islands of Perdido Key and Santa Rosa Island extend from the Pandhandle's western extremity through Fort Walton Beach to Destin.

Britton Hill is the highest natural point in the state

History

19th century
Throughout the 19th century, the Panhandle was sparsely populated, dotted in places with small farming communities, none of which had as many as a thousand residents. Many Panhandle residents had, in fact, migrated to the area from Alabama and had relatives there; it was also easier to trade with and travel to southern Alabama than to reach East Florida by slow, arduous journey across the thick cypress swamps and dense pine forests of the Panhandle. It was natural for West Floridians to feel that they had more in common with their nearby neighbors in Alabama than with the residents of the peninsula, hundreds of miles away.

In 1821, Pensacola was the only city (in 19th-century terms) in West Florida, with a population estimated to be about 3,000. In the 1850 census, the enumerated population of Pensacola was 2,164 (including 741 slaves and 350 "free Negroes").

Alabama annexation proposals
During the course of the century, proposals for ceding the Florida counties west of the Apalachicola River to Alabama were often raised:
In 1811, while Florida was still a Spanish possession, American settlers in the territory sent a petition to Congress asking to be incorporated into the Mississippi Territory, which at that time included present-day Alabama. (See West Florida article.)
In 1819, the constitutional convention of Alabama asked Congress to include West Florida in their new state.
In 1822, only a year after the U.S. acquired the entire Florida territory from Spain, residents of West Florida sent a petition to the U.S. House of Representatives asking that their section be annexed to Alabama, and Alabama Senator John Williams Walker also promoted the idea.
In 1826, the Pensacola Gazette published a number of letters advocating annexation to Alabama, though the editor remarked that some Pensacolians opposed the idea.
In 1840, a public meeting in Pensacola produced a demand that West Florida be united with Alabama. In the same year, the territorial Legislature notified Congress that it opposed allowing Alabama to annex West Florida, but in 1844, the year before statehood, the Legislature reversed its stance and asked that West Florida be separated.
In 1856, advocates of annexation were able to get a bill passed by the Legislature authorizing a referendum on the issue, but Governor James E. Broome vetoed the measure. The Pensacola Gazette reported that "annexation is desired by a large majority of the people" of the area.
In 1858, the Alabama Legislature unsuccessfully tried to open negotiations with Florida on the subject.
The annexation issue was eclipsed by the Civil War and the war's effects on the region, but in 1868, with Pensacola now connected by the Panhandle's sole railroad line to the Alabama cities of Mobile and Montgomery, the issue came to a head again and was finally put to a vote of the people. In that year, the Alabama Legislature approved a joint resolution authorizing their Governor to negotiate with the Governor of Florida about the annexation of West Florida. An offer of one million dollars in Alabama state bonds, paying 8 percent interest for thirty years, was included. Both states appointed commissioners to make detailed recommendations on the matter.
On November 2, 1869, a referendum was held in the West Florida counties (except Jackson, which was in the throes of bloody racial violence), with a result of 1162 to 661 in favor of annexation. However, political objection developed in Alabama to the high price, and the Legislature took no action on the results of the referendum.
In 1873, a similar proposal was made in the Alabama Legislature, which the state senate approved, though it did not pass a separate proposal to finance the measure by selling all of Alabama's territory west of the Tombigbee River, including the city of Mobile, to Mississippi. However, nothing came of this action.
In 1901, Alabama made yet another offer when the Legislature appointed a commission to negotiate with Florida about annexation, but this attempt, too, was unsuccessful.

The building of the Pensacola and Atlantic Railroad, completed in 1883, finally linked Pensacola and the Panhandle solidly with the rest of the state and ended the region's isolation, although from time to time during the twentieth century there were still occasional calls for annexation that generated some public discussion but no legislative action.

20th century

In the last quarter of the century, hurricanes that directly struck the area and caused significant damage included Hurricane Eloise in 1975, Hurricane Kate in 1985, and Hurricane Erin and Hurricane Opal, both in 1995.

The area was a prime target of the March 1993 Storm of the Century.

21st century

The Panhandle suffered direct hits from Hurricane Ivan in 2004 and Hurricane Dennis in 2005.

On June 23, 2010, oil from the Deepwater Horizon oil spill landed on Pensacola Beach and Navarre Beach, damaging the fishing and tourism industries, and prompting a massive clean-up effort.

On October 10, 2018, the Panhandle suffered a direct hit from Hurricane Michael, with winds as high as 160 MPH. Michael was one of only four category 5 hurricanes to ever hit the US mainland. Thousands of homes were destroyed, and apartment rents in Panama City increased, with a $500 apartment renting for $1000 in 2019. Recovery from Hurricane Michael was not complete in June 2019, and disaster relief for the Panhandle remained stalled in Congress.

Economy

Historically, the economy of the Panhandle depended mainly on farming, forestry and lumbering, paper mills, import/export shipping at Pensacola and to a lesser extent at Panama City, shipbuilding, and commercial fishing. After World War II, the economy was boosted by the numerous military bases established in the region, as well as the growth of tourism and the hospitality industry.

In addition to military bases, state and local governments, hospitals, schools, and colleges, major private employers in the second half of the twentieth century included Monsanto and Westinghouse plants at Pensacola, the St. Joe Paper Company in Port St. Joe, and Gulf Power, a major electric utility company.

Unlike central and southern Florida, the Panhandle has never been a producer of citrus crops because the area is subject to regular frosts and freezes in wintertime, which destroy citrus fruits.

Transportation

Road
Interstate 10 is the only interstate highway in the Panhandle, connecting the extreme west with North Florida and Jacksonville. Other older east–west routes include U.S. Highway 90 and U.S. Highway 98. Important north–south routes west of the Apalachicola River include U.S. Highway 29, U.S. Highway 331, and U.S. Highway 231, all linking to Alabama and Interstate 65. State Road 20 stretches from Niceville to Tallahassee.

Rail
Freight service is provided by the Class III Florida Gulf & Atlantic Railroad, which acquired most of the CSX main line from Pensacola to Jacksonville on June 1, 2019. (For the history of this line, see Pensacola and Atlantic Railroad.)

Passenger service ended with the creation of Amtrak in 1971, but was revived with the extension of the Sunset Limited to Orlando beginning in 1993; however, passenger service was discontinued after Hurricane Katrina struck the Gulf Coast in 2005. Other regional short-line railroads serving the Panhandle are the Alabama and Gulf Coast Railway (formerly BNSF Railway, ex-Frisco Railway), the Bay Line Railroad, and the AN Railway.

Air
Major airports include:

 Pensacola International Airport
 Destin-Fort Walton Beach Airport
 Northwest Florida Beaches International Airport
 Tallahassee International Airport
 Bob Sikes Airport
 Destin Executive Airport
 DeFuniak Springs Airport
 Apalachicola Regional Airport
 Perry-Foley Airport

Education

The following institutions of higher learning are located in the Florida Panhandle.

State University System:
Florida Agricultural and Mechanical University (Tallahassee)
Florida State University (Tallahassee)
University of West Florida (Pensacola)

Florida College System:
Chipola College (Marianna)
Gulf Coast State College (Panama City)
Northwest Florida State College (Niceville)
Pensacola State College (Pensacola)
Tallahassee Community College (Tallahassee)

Religiously affiliated:
Baptist College of Florida (Graceville)
Pensacola Christian College (Pensacola)

Politics
The politics of the Florida Panhandle vary considerably depending on location. The western Panhandle, particularly the Emerald Coast, was one of the earliest areas to shake off its Yellow Dog Democrat roots, and since the 1990s has become the most Republican part of Florida. Pensacola, Fort Walton Beach, Destin and Panama City regularly give Republicans close to or over 70% margins in state and national elections. However, Tallahassee and Gadsden County tend to be strongly Democratic. In the 2008 Presidential election, John McCain received 421,287 votes (60.1%) in the Panhandle, while Barack Obama received 279,206 votes (39.9%).

Culture and sports

 Great Gulfcoast Arts Festival
 Florida A&M Rattlers
 Florida State Seminoles
 Pensacola Blue Wahoos
 Pensacola Ice Flyers
 Red Hills Horse Trials
 Springtime Tallahassee
 Tallahassee Wine and Food Festival

Counties
The following counties west of the Apalachicola River are always included in references to the Panhandle:

Bay County
Calhoun County
Escambia County
Gulf County
Holmes County
Jackson County
Okaloosa County
Santa Rosa County
Walton County
Washington County

Some or all of the following counties east of the Apalachicola, in the Big Bend subregion, are sometimes considered part of the Panhandle:

Dixie County
Franklin County
Gadsden County
Hamilton County
Jefferson County
Lafayette County
Leon County
Liberty County
Madison County
Taylor County
Wakulla County

Cities and towns

Places marked with an asterisk (*) lie east of the Apalachicola River, and may not be considered part of the Panhandle by some residents or writers.

Apalachicola
Blountstown
Bonifay
Brent
Callaway
Carrabelle*
Cedar Grove
Century
Chipley
Crestview
Cross City*
DeFuniak Springs
Destin
Fort Walton Beach
Gulf Breeze
Jay
Lynn Haven
Madison*
Marianna
Mexico Beach
Milton
Niceville
Panama City
Panama City Beach
Paxton
Pensacola
Port St Joe
Quincy*
Springfield
Tallahassee*
Valparaiso

Population of the major metropolitan areas in the Panhandle:

 Pensacola-Ferry Pass-Brent Metropolitan Statistical Area - 455,102 (2009)
 Fort Walton Beach-Crestview-Destin, Florida Metropolitan Statistical Area - 180,822 (2010)
 Panama City-Lynn Haven-Panama City Beach Metropolitan Statistical Area - 202,236 (2020)
 Tallahassee Standard Metropolitan Statistical Area - 367,413 (2010)

Beaches

The Panhandle is renowned for the white sand beaches and blue-green waters of its barrier islands fronting the Gulf of Mexico. According to the National Park Service:

The stunning sugar-white beaches of Gulf Islands National Seashore are composed of fine quartz eroded from granite in the Appalachian Mountains. The sand is carried seaward by rivers and creeks and deposited by currents along the shore.

The beach towns in the Panhandle, many of which play host to college students during spring break, are sometimes derisively called the Redneck Riviera. The term was used as the title of a song by country music artist Tom T. Hall on his 1996 album Songs from Sopchoppy. The album takes its name from a town in rural Wakulla County, near Tallahassee.

Tourists have been drawn to the Panhandle since the building of the Pensacola and Atlantic Railroad in the 1880s. Pensacola Beach has been a major tourist attraction since the building of bridges between the mainland and Santa Rosa Island in 1931. After World War II, an increase in both tourism and population of the area led to a proliferation of motels, restaurants, bars, tourist attractions, and amusement parks along the coast, concentrated in Pensacola Beach, Fort Walton Beach, and Panama City Beach. Examples include the Gulfarium marine park and aquarium in Fort Walton Beach, and the former Miracle Strip Amusement Park (1963–2004) in Panama City Beach.

In 1971, the federal government acquired many acres of the coastal islands in Escambia, Santa Rosa, and Okaloosa counties, preserving them from commercial development by establishing the Gulf Islands National Seashore, which also covers some islands off the Mississippi coast. Other beach areas protected by the state of Florida include

 Perdido Key State Park
 Big Lagoon State Park 
 Henderson Beach State Park
 Grayton Beach State Park
 St. Andrews State Park
 St. Joseph Peninsula State Park
 St. George Island State Park

Both state and federal parks offer facilities for camping, picnicking, and other recreational pursuits. In addition, some parts of the coastline are federal property belonging to Pensacola Naval Air Station, Eglin Air Force Base, and Tyndall Air Force Base, and so are likewise protected from commercial development.

In addition, seven state aquatic preserves, covering thousands of acres of submerged lands in coastal areas, are located in the Panhandle. A number of other state parks, preserves, and forests are located inland.

The 1970s also saw the beginnings of a number of upscale beach resorts, condominium towers, vacation homes, and planned communities, such as Seaside and Sandestin, so that most of the privately owned areas of the coastline are now heavily developed.

Military bases
Major military bases include the Pensacola Naval Air Station (the home of Naval Aviation in the United States), Eglin Air Force Base and Hurlburt Field near Ft. Walton Beach, Naval Support Activity Panama City in Panama City Beach, and Tyndall Air Force Base near Panama City. Smaller military bases in the Florida panhandle include the Center for Information Warfare Training in Pensacola, Naval Air Station Whiting Field near Milton and Duke Field near Crestview.

The 1983-84 television show Emerald Point N.A.S. was set in a naval air station somewhere in the American South, similar to Pensacola NAS. The 1997-2000 action/adventure series Pensacola: Wings of Gold was explicitly set there.

See also
 Battle of Santa Rosa Island
 Bellamy Road
 Emerald Coast
 Florida Caverns State Park
 Florida in the American Civil War
 Floridan aquifer
 Forgotten Coast
 Fort Barrancas
 Fort McRee
 Fort Pickens
 Gulf Wind
 National Naval Aviation Museum
 Sunset Limited
 West Florida

Notes

References

External links

 Outdoor Gulf Coast – Online recreation for Northwest Florida
 Panama City Beach Convention & Visitors Bureau – Official online travel planning resource for Panama City Beach
 Historic Pensacola Village and T. T. Wentworth, Jr., State Museum

Bibliography

 DeBolt, Dean. "The Florida Panhandle," pp. 404–445 in The Book Lover's Guide to Florida, ed. Kevin M. McCarthy. Sarasota, Florida: Pineapple Press, 1992.  (Contains an extensive bibliography of fiction and nonfiction works about people and places in the Panhandle.) 
 Hollis, Tim. Florida’s Miracle Strip: From Redneck Riviera to Emerald Coast. University Press of Mississippi, 2004.  
 Jahoda, Gloria. The Other Florida. Scribner, 1967.
 King, Heidi Tyline. The Pelican Guide to the Florida Panhandle. Pelican Publishing, 1999. 
 O'Donovan, Michael, and Robin Rowan. Florida's Northwest: First Places, Wild Places, Favorite Places. Terra Nova Publishing, 2005.  
 Ziewitz, Kathryn, and June Wiaz. Green Empire: The St. Joe Company and the Remaking of Florida's Panhandle. University Press of Florida, 2006. 

Regions of Florida
North Florida